Muhammad Moazam Ali Khan Jatoi (born 8 October 1981) is a Pakistani politician who had been a member of the Provincial Assembly of Punjab from July 2022 till January 2023. He had previously been a member of the National Assembly of Pakistan from 2008 to 2013.

Early life
He was born on 8 October  1981.

Political career
He was elected to the National Assembly of Pakistan from Constituency NA-179 (Muzaffargarh-IV) as a candidate of Pakistan Peoples Party (PPP) in 2008 Pakistani general election. He was appointed as minister of State for food. He received 79,643 votes and defeated Syed Basit Sultan Bukhari. In April 2012, he was inducted into the federal cabinet of Prime Minister Yousaf Raza Gillani and was appointed as Minister of State for Food Security and Research. In June 2012, he was inducted into the federal cabinet of Prime Minister Raja Pervaiz Ashraf and was re-appointed as Minister of State for National Food Security and Research where he continued to serve until April 2013.

He ran for the seat of the National Assembly from Constituency NA-179 (Muzaffargarh-IV) as a candidate of PPP in 2013 Pakistani general election but was unsuccessful. He received 73,199 votes and lost the seat to Syed Basit Sultan Bukhari.

He was elected to the Provincial Assembly of Punjab from PP-272 (Muzaffargarh-V) as a candidate of the Pakistan Tehreek-e-Insaf (PTI) in the 2022 Punjab provincial by-elections.

References

Living people
Pakistani MNAs 2008–2013
1981 births